Chang Xiangyu was a Chinese opera actress who performed renditions of the story of Hua Mulan across China in support of the Korean War and who appeared in a 1956 screen adaption.

Biography
Chang was born in 1923 into a poor farming family in Gongxian County, Henan. From an early age she was taught how to sing and perform Yu opera by her father Zhang Fuxian who feared she may become a child bride. At aged thirteen she appeared in a performance of the Chinese classic Romance of the Western Chamber were afterwards she was given the title Queen of Yuju Opera. In 1944 she married a school headmaster, Chang Xianzhang who retired to help Chang in her career and to establish a school teaching Yu opera. The school which was called the Xiang Yu Opera Troupe opened in 1948 in the capital of Shaanxi Xi'an.

On the outbreak of the Korean War, Chang took part in live action performances of Mulan across China to raise funds for a military plane. Along with other opera troops she eventually raised 1.52 billion yuan, enough for one plane. By 1956 the Chinese Communist Party had banned all American films from being imported into China and nationalized the country's film studios so as to produce films with pro-party messages. To tout their gender egalitarian policies, a film about Mulan was made with Chang cast in the lead role.

Later Chang got into politics and was elected to the National People's Congress attending the first three session and then the fifth sixth and seventh. In 1995 she was awarded National Advanced Worker award for her contributions.

Filmography

References 

1923 births
2004 deaths
Singers from Henan
Actresses from Henan
Henan opera actresses
20th-century Chinese actresses
Delegates to the 1st National People's Congress
Delegates to the 2nd National People's Congress
Delegates to the 3rd National People's Congress
Delegates to the 5th National People's Congress
Delegates to the 6th National People's Congress
Delegates to the 7th National People's Congress
20th-century Chinese women singers
People from Gongyi